KTE may refer to:

 Kindred: The Embraced, an American science fiction television series
 Knuckles the Echidna, a character in the Sonic the Hedgehog video game series
 Kecskeméti TE, a Hungarian football team that currently plays at the first division of Hungary